Maria Sanchez (born 1989) is an American tennis player.

Maria Sanchez or Maria Sánchez may also refer to:

María Andrea Sánchez (born 1994), Mexican footballer
María Sánchez (footballer) (born 1996), Mexican footballer
María José Martínez Sánchez (born 1982), Spanish tennis player
María Sánchez Lorenzo (born 1977), Spanish tennis player
Rosario Sánchez (born 1973), born María del Rosario Sánchez Guerrero, Mexican racewalker
María Sánchez (water polo) (born 1994), Spanish water polo player
María Sánchez (diver) (born 2005), Mexican diver